This is the Recorded Music NZ list of number-one albums in New Zealand during the 2020s decade. In New Zealand, Recorded Music NZ compiles the top 40 albums chart each Friday, and dates the chart for the following Monday. Over-the-counter sales of both physical and digital formats make up the data. Certifications are awarded for the number of shipments to retailers. Gold certifications are awarded after 7,500 sales, and platinum certifications after 15,000.

The following albums were all number one in New Zealand in the 2020s.

Number ones
Key
 – Number-one album of the year
 – Album of New Zealand origin
 – Number-one album of the year, of New Zealand origin

Notes

References

Number-one albums
New Zealand Albums
2020s